Adelaide Aquilla (pronounced ah-quill-ah, born March 3, 1999) is an American athlete who specialises in the shot put.

From Westlake, Ohio, she attended Magnificat High School before attending The Ohio State University where she was coached by Ashley Kovacs, wife of Olympian shot putter Joe Kovacs. 

Aquilla was a 2019 NCAA outdoor qualifier in the shot put and finished 12th with a personal best outdoor toss of 16.59m to earn second-team All-America honors. In 2021 she was successful in defending the title of Big Ten Conference indoor shot put champion, winning at the 2020 meet with a personal best toss of 17.82 meters, and in 2021 she set another personal best with a throw of 19.12m. She was a 2020 NCAA indoor All-American in the shot with the nation’s third-longest throw. In 2021 Aquilla won both indoor and outdoor NCAA titles and she was named Ohio State’s female athlete of the year alongside Justin Fields as her male counterpart.

On June 24, 2021 Aquilla finished in third place at the US Olympic trails to secure a place at the delayed 2020 Summer Olympics with a throw of 18.95m in Eugene, Oregon behind Raven Saunders and Jessica Ramsey.

Aquilla won additional NCAA championships at the Outdoor Track and Field Championships in 2022 and the Indoor Track and Field Championships in 2023, setting a collegiate record with a throw of 19.64 meters in the former.

References

External links
 
 
 
 
 

1999 births
Living people
Ohio State Buckeyes women's track and field athletes
American female shot putters
Athletes (track and field) at the 2020 Summer Olympics
Olympic track and field athletes of the United States
21st-century American women